is a maze chase arcade video game released by Namco in 1981. It is a lightly tweaked version of 1980's Rally-X, with slightly enhanced graphics, easier gameplay, a new soundtrack, and a "Lucky Flag" that gives the player extra points for remaining fuel when collected.

New Rally-X was manufactured in greater numbers and was much more popular in Japan than its predecessor. While the original Rally-X, released under a Midway Games license, was a moderate hit in the United States, Midway only distributed New Rally-X as an upgrade kit for Rally-X cabinets.

Gameplay

The player controls a blue racing car. The objective is to collect ten yellow flags from the maze before fuel bar runs out. Each round has eight common flags, one "special" flag and one "lucky" flag. The special flag doubles the score of any flags collected afterward until the level ends. The lucky flag, which was not present in the original game, gives bonus points based on how much fuel the player has.

Enemy red cars attempt to ram the player's vehicle, causing one life to be lost. A button releases a smoke screen, at the cost of fuel, making the red cars unable to move for a short time if they run over the smoke screens. Boulders in the maze are deadly if collided with.

The third level and every fourth after that is a bonus round, labelled "Challenging Stage", where red cars remain still.

Legacy
A version of New Rally-X is the load-up game in the PlayStation Portable game Ridge Racer. It was also included in Namco Museum Battle Collection for the PSP, along with an entirely new "Arrangement" version of it which has updated graphics, music, and new gameplay mechanics. The game was also released on the Microsoft Xbox 360 Live Arcade service on December 27, 2006, and on the Wii Virtual Console in Japan on October 6, 2009. In addition, it has also been included in several editions of the Namco plug-n-play game series, from Jakks Pacific. A version known as New Rally-X S (the "S" stands for "Special") was also released on Facebook. In November 2010, it was included in Namco Museum Megamix for the Wii. The game was included on the Nintendo Switch and PlayStation Network as part of the Arcade Archives series in February 2022.

References

External links

 

1981 video games
Arcade video games
Maze games
Mobile games
Nintendo Switch games
PlayStation 4 games
Namco arcade games
Video games developed in Japan
Virtual Console games
Xbox 360 Live Arcade games
Hamster Corporation games

ja:ニューラリーX